Colombian football clubs have entered South American association football competitions, as of Copa Libertadores and Copa Sudamericana since 1960, when Millonarios participated in the first edition of Copa Libertadores. In 2016, Atlético Nacional became the first Colombian club to take part in the FIFA Club World Cup.

Copa Libertadores is considered the most important club tournament in South America. Two Colombian clubs have won this tournament: Atlético Nacional have won twice (in 1989 and 2016), Once Caldas have won it once (in 2004). Copa Sudamericana has been won by a Colombian club once: Santa Fe in 2015.

FIFA Club World Cup

Copa Libertadores

Copa Sudamericana

Recopa Sudamericana

Intercontinental Cup

Suruga Bank Championship

Copa Merconorte

Supercopa Sudamericana

Copa CONMEBOL

Copa Interamericana

Copa Simón Bolívar

References

Football in Colombia
South American football clubs in international competitions